The Chinese Silver Panda is a series of silver bullion coins issued by the People's Republic of China. The design of the panda is changed every year and minted in different sizes and denominations, ranging from 0.5 troy oz. to 1 kilogram. Starting in 2016, Pandas switched to metric sizes. The 1 troy ounce coin was reduced to 30 grams, while the 5 troy ounce coin was reduced to 150 grams.  There is also a Gold Panda series issued featuring the same designs as the Silver Panda coins.

History 

The first Silver Panda coins—issued 10 yuan Panda bullion in 1983, 1984, and 1985—were proof quality, with a precious metal content of 27 grams of 0.900 fine silver and a diameter of 38.6 mm. Mintages were only 10,000 for each year. No Silver Pandas were issued in 1986. The 1987 Silver Panda coins were minted in proof quality from 1 troy oz. of sterling (.925 fine) silver, with a diameter of 40 mm. There are several mints that produced Silver Panda coins over the years, including: Shanghai, Shenyang, and Shenzhen. Unlike coins made by US and German mints that carry mintmarks to distinguish their origin, Chinese mints generally do not carry mintmarks. In certain years there are minor variations in the coin design—such as the size of the date, and temple. That allows the originating mint to be determined. An example is 1996 where different mints produced coins with minor variations in the font size of the date on the obverse side of the coins. In 2015 the Gold and Silver Panda coins were not labeled with metal fineness and weight. This information returned in 2016 when the 1 troy ounce coin was replaced by the 30-gram coin (one troy ounce is approximately 31.1 grams).

The official distributor in China for the Silver and Gold Panda coins is the China Gold Coin Incorporation (CGCI).

As of 2020, the highest-priced coin is a perfect 1983 proof panda worth $16,430.  The highest-priced, non-proof coin is a perfect large-date 1991 panda worth $3,100.

Specifications

Design 

The center of the obverse is a depiction of The Hall of Prayer for Good Harvests located in the Temple of Heaven complex in Beijing.  The Hall was built between 1406 to 1420.  Chinese characters on top say "", meaning the People's Republic of China and the bottom the year of issue. If the issue is a commemorative issue, the theme will be marked here also.  The reverse shows portraits of the giant panda that changes every year (except for 2001 and 2002, which share the same design).

Minting history

There are many varieties of types of coins issued:
 Bulk Uncirculated
 Proof
 Gilding (either side or both)
 Colored (only obverse side known)
 Privy marked for a commemorative issue
 Extra wording of a special event.  For example, where the coins will be sold, such as a coin show or to commemorate an event or place.

See also
Bullion
Bullion coin
Inflation hedge
Silver as an investment

References
 General
 2020 Standard Catalog of World Coins - 1901–2000, 47th Edition, publication date 2019, Krause Publications, 
 2020 Standard Catalog of World Coins - 2001–Date, 14th Edition, publication date 2019, Krause Publications, 

Specific

External links

 Website of the China Gold Coin Corporation, the official distributor of the Chinese panda coins in China.

Giant pandas
Bullion coins of China
Silver bullion coins